Isabelle Is Afraid of Men (French: Isabelle a peur des hommes) is a 1957 French drama film directed by Jean Gourguet and starring  Cathia Caro, Roger Dumas and Michel François.

Cast
 Cathia Caro as Isabelle 
 Roger Dumas  as Maxime Brissac 
 Michel François as Yves 
 Simone Paris as Tante Flora 
 Junie Astor  as Béarice, mère d'Isabelle 
 Robert Vattier as M. Brissac 
 Pierre Massimi  as Didier 
 Brigitte Briant  as Nicole 
 Gérard Fallec  as Dodo 
 Régine Lovi as Poussy 
 Danièle Marescot 
 Yves-Marie Maurin
 Solange Sicard as La grand-mère

References

Bibliography 
 Rège, Philippe. Encyclopedia of French Film Directors, Volume 1. Scarecrow Press, 2009.

External links 
 

1957 films
1957 drama films
French drama films
1950s French-language films
Films directed by Jean Gourguet
1950s French films